Aspen Extreme is a 1993 American drama film written and directed by Patrick Hasburgh. The plot is about two ski buddies, T.J. Burke (Paul Gross) and Dexter Rutecki (Peter Berg), who move from Brighton, Michigan to Aspen, Colorado to seek a better life. The two friends quickly become Aspen ski instructors, but women, drugs, and job troubles threaten to destroy their relationship. Along the way, TJ tries to realize his dream of becoming a professional writer, and the pair train for the upcoming Powder 8 ski competition.

The supporting cast includes Finola Hughes, Teri Polo, William Russ, and Trevor Eve.  The cover of the US video release quotes the Seattle Times as referring to the film as "Top Gun on the Ski Slopes."

Plot
T.J. Burke tires of his auto assembly worker job in Detroit, quits, and convinces his friend Dexter Rutecki to move with him to Aspen. After succeeding in the new instructor tryouts for the Aspen Ski School, they both become ski instructors, although T.J. secretly intercedes on Dexter's behalf. While T.J. advances to become the most popular instructor of the school during the season, he has to constantly watch out for Dexter, whose social skills are less honed and whose future is less bright. Along the way, they meet the young local radio DJ (Robin, played by Teri Polo) as well as a rich cougar-ish woman (Bryce, played by Finola Hughes), who selects the most desirable new instructor each year for her latest plaything.

After watching the famous Aspen Powder 8 competition, T.J. and Dexter agree to team up to try to win the next season's award. While skiing out of bounds, T.J. falls into a large sinkhole in the snow, plunging many feet into a stream. Dexter rescues him, and because skiing out of bounds would get them fired, takes him to Robin's house so she can patch him up without notifying the ski school director.

Somewhat later, after losing control of a school client (a poor skier who ends up sliding out of control into downtown Aspen), Dexter is suspended from the school and eventually links up with the wrong crowd, including Tina, a beautiful girl with a mysterious background. Hard up for cash, Dexter reluctantly accepts an offer to act as a drug courier. When he gets spooked and dumps the drugs, he is assaulted in retribution and left to freeze outdoors in the Aspen winter. Again, T.J. rescues him, by paying off the drug guys with money borrowed from Bryce. T.J. then moves out of the house he shared with Dexter, and in with Bryce, who purchased his companionship with the loan.

After spending some interminable and unsatisfying time with Bryce, T.J. and Dexter awkwardly rekindle their friendship and reset their goal to win the Powder 8 competition. T.J. and Dexter decide to ski out of bounds in order to train for the upcoming event. While skiing outside the boundaries of Aspen, T.J. and Dexter set off an avalanche. Dexter suffers a tragic demise, while T.J. escapes with minor injuries. Later, in deep depression, T.J. comes to realize how his relationship with Bryce had no particular meaning, and writes of his and Dexter's friendship. The article is published in a major ski magazine, finally providing T.J. with some satisfaction for his writing efforts after many prior rejections. His friendship with Robin also reawakens, as they both mourn Dexter's loss.

T.J. is sought out by a newly hired young ski instructor to be his partner in the Powder 8. They win the competition, beating T.J.'s nemesis throughout the movie. The victory is bittersweet, as he remembers the dream that he and Dexter had of winning the Powder 8, and in the end, he and Robin reconcile as he finally reveals that he loves her.

Cast
Paul Gross as T.J. Burke
Peter Berg as Dexter Rutecki
Finola Hughes as Bryce Kellogg
Teri Polo as Robin Hand
William Russ as Dave Ritchie
Trevor Eve as Karl Stall
Martin Kemp as Franz Houser
Stewart Finley McLennan as Rudy Zucker
Tony Griffin as Gary Eimiller
Julie Royer as Michelle Proux
Patrick T. Johnson as Bill Swanson
William McNamara as Todd Pounds
Gary Eimiller as Jinx Stone
Stan Ivar as Mr. Parker
David Boreanaz as Spectator (uncredited)
Karla Souza as Kimberly
Nicolette Scorsese as Tina

Production
Writer and debut director Patrick Hasburgh developed the screenplay for Aspen Extreme based on his experiences working as a ski instructor in Aspen, Colorado where among his pupils was Walt Disney Pictures chairman, Michael Eisner, who later agreed to distribute the picture through Disney’s Buena Vista Pictures Distribution, Inc.

Principal photography began in March 1992 with filming in Aspen and other skiing communities, such as Snowmass, Ajax, Highlands, and Buttermilk, with additional shooting at the Ford Truck Plant in Wayne, Michigan, the Mt. Brighton ski area, and the surrounding suburbs. Avalanche and rescue scenes were filmed over four days on a sound stage in North Hollywood, CA.

Skiing footage
The backcountry and bowl skiing sequences were filmed at Aspen Highlands with the permission of owner Whip Jones and Alta Ski Area. Big mountain extreme skiers Scot Schmidt and Doug Coombs (and several others) are credited as (stand-in) skiers.

Reception
Aspen Extreme received negative reviews from critics and holds a 22% rating on Rotten Tomatoes.

Controversy
The film’s release coincided with the Boycott Colorado movement following the passage of 1992 Colorado Amendment 2, which prohibited civil rights legislation for homosexuals and bisexuals. It was suggested the film was likely to cause controversy due to prominent product placement from the “right-wing” Colorado-based company Coors.

References

External links
 
 
 
 

1993 films
1993 directorial debut films
1993 drama films
1990s buddy drama films
1990s sports drama films
American buddy drama films
American sports drama films
Films scored by Michael Convertino
Films set in Colorado
Films set in Detroit
Films shot in Colorado
Hollywood Pictures films
Pitkin County, Colorado
American skiing films
Avalanches in film
1990s English-language films
1990s American films